"Dizzy" Dean Davidson is an American singer, guitarist, and drummer from Philadelphia, Pennsylvania. He was a founding member, lead vocalist and rhythm guitarist of the glam metal band Britny Fox from 1985 to 1990. After leaving Britny Fox, Davidson formed the band Blackeyed Susan. The band disbanded in 1992 but reunited in 2000 without Davidson.  In 2010, Davidson attempted to reunite Britny Fox but did not get past the talking stage. The band name, Britny Fox was named after the Welsh coat of arms of one of Davidson's 18th century ancestors. Davidson later expressed a dislike for the Britny Fox material, saying he was "controlled by management and the label" and calling the music "prefabricated".

In 2007, Davidson released a folk rock album called Drive My Karma.

Discography 
Britny Fox

 Britny Fox (1988)
Boys in Heat (1989)
The Best of Britny Fox (2001)

Blackeyed Susan

 Electric Rattlebone (1991)
 Just a Taste (1992)

Jarod Dean

 A Weekend Soul Massage (1999)

Love Saves the Day

 Superstar (2001)

Solo

 Drive My Karma (2007)

References

External links
 YouTube Video of Dean Davidson

Living people
American rock singers
Britny Fox members
Year of birth missing (living people)